Anica Černej (3 April 1900, in Čadram, Oplotnica – 3 May 1944, in Neubrandenburg) was a Slovene author and poet.

Career
Černej worked at college of education in Ljubljana, where her main interests were social and pedagogical subjects.

Internment and death
In the autumn of 1943, she was arrested together with many professors and students by German occupying armed forces and was sent to Ravensbrück concentration camp and later on Neubrandenburg where she died shortly thereafter.

See also 

 Slovenian literature

1900 births
1944 deaths
People from the Municipality of Oplotnica
Slovenian women poets
Slovenian poets
Slovenian civilians killed in World War II
People who died in Ravensbrück concentration camp
20th-century Slovenian women writers
20th-century Slovenian writers